Benny Carter Meets Oscar Peterson is a 1986 album by alto saxophonist Benny Carter, featuring the pianist Oscar Peterson.

Track listing 
 "Just Friends" (John Klemmer, Sam M. Lewis) – 6:37
 "Sweet Lorraine" (Cliff Burwell, Mitchell Parish) – 6:46
 "Baubles, Bangles and Beads" (Robert C. Wright, George Forrest, Alexander Borodin) – 8:13
 "It's a Wonderful World" (Harold Adamson, Jan Savitt, Johnny Watson) – 6:30
 "If I Had You" (Jimmy Campbell, Reg Connelly, Ted Shapiro) – 6:43
 "Whispering" (Richard H. Coburn, Vincent Rose, John Schoenberger) – 4:50
 "Some Kind of Blues" (Benny Carter, Oscar Peterson) – 4:43

Personnel 
 Benny Carter – alto saxophone
 Oscar Peterson – piano
 Joe Pass – guitar
 Dave Young – double bass
 Martin Drew – drums

References 

1986 albums
Oscar Peterson albums
Benny Carter albums
Albums produced by Norman Granz
Pablo Records albums